Garrett is an unincorporated community and coal town in Floyd County, Kentucky, United States. It is located at the intersection of Kentucky Route 80 and Kentucky Route 7. CSX E&BV Subdivision also passes through the center of town between Front Street and State Route 7.

The town was founded by the Elk Horn Coal Company.

A post office was established in 1910 and named "Ballard".  In 1914 the name was changed to Garrett, for brothers John and Robert Garrett, both Baltimore bankers and coal company financiers.

Between July 26th and July 28th the nearby town of Jackson, KY recorded 8 inches of precipitation leading to widespread destruction and loss of life in and around Garrett.

References

Unincorporated communities in Floyd County, Kentucky
Unincorporated communities in Kentucky
Coal towns in Kentucky